Joana Sofia Barbosa Vasconcelos (born 22 February 1991) is a Portuguese sprint canoer who has competed since the 2010s. At club level, she represents Benfica.

Career

Born in Vila Nova de Gaia, Vasconcelos started canoeing in Clube Náutico de Crestuma, where she won the ICF Canoe Kayak Sprint Junior World Championships in K-1 1000m class that took place in Moscow in 2009. The 18-year-old then moved to Benfica in 2010, and currently studies and practises at the Center for High Performance in Montemor-o-Velho.

She won a bronze medal in the K-2 200 m event at the 2012 Canoe Sprint European Championships in Zagreb.

Vasconcelos qualified for London 2012 in K4 500, K2 500 and K2 200 in the 2011 ICF Canoe Sprint World Championships. In the 2012 Summer Olympics, she ended 6th in Women's K-2 500 metres race along Beatriz Gomes and also 6th in the Women's K-4 500 metres along with Teresa Portela, Helena Rodrigues and Beatriz Gomes.

References

External links
Canoe09.ca profile 
Sports-reference.com profile

1991 births
Living people
Sportspeople from Vila Nova de Gaia
Canoeists at the 2012 Summer Olympics
Canoeists at the 2020 Summer Olympics
Olympic canoeists of Portugal
Portuguese female canoeists
S.L. Benfica (canoeing)
Mediterranean Games silver medalists for Portugal
Competitors at the 2018 Mediterranean Games
Mediterranean Games medalists in canoeing
European Games competitors for Portugal
Canoeists at the 2015 European Games
Canoeists at the 2019 European Games
21st-century Portuguese women